Komenda-Edina-Eguafo-Abbrem is one of the constituencies represented in the Parliament of Ghana. It elects one Member of Parliament (MP) by the first past the post system of election. Komenda-Edina-Eguafo-Abbrem is located in the Komenda/Edina/Eguafo/Abirem district of the Central Region of Ghana.

Boundaries
The seat is located entirely within the Komenda/Edina/Eguafo/Abirem district of the Central Region of Ghana. Both the district and the constituency share common borders. It is in the south western corner of the region. It shares its northern and western borders with the Western Region of Ghana. To the north east is the Hemang Lower Denkyira constituency and to the east, the Cape Coast constituency. The Atlantic Ocean or Gulf of Guinea is to the south.

Members of Parliament

Elections

 
 
 
 
 

As Paa Kwesi Nduom, who was a Minister of state in the New Patriotic Party Kufuor government was contesting the elections, the NPP decided not to field a candidate in this constituency but to back Nduom of the CPP instead.

See also
List of Ghana Parliament constituencies
Komenda/Edina/Eguafo/Abirem District

References 

Parliamentary constituencies in the Central Region (Ghana)